This is a list of accidents and incidents involving the Douglas DC-3 that occurred in 1960, including aircraft based on the DC-3 airframe such as the Douglas C-47 Skytrain and Lisunov Li-2. Military accidents are included; and hijackings and incidents of terrorism are covered, although acts of war involving military aircraft are outside the scope of this list.

See also
List of accidents and incidents involving the DC-3 in the 1960s

References

Notes
 Military versions of the DC-3 were known as C-47 Skytrain, C-48, C-49, C-50, C-51, C-52, C-53 Skytrooper, C-68, C-84, C-117 Super Dakota and YC-129 by the United States Army Air Forces and as the R4D by the United States Navy. In Royal Air Force (and other British Commonwealth air forces') service, these aircraft were known as Dakotas.

1960
DC-3